The Elgin County Railway Museum is a rail transport museum in St. Thomas, Ontario.

The museum and most of the collections are housed in the former Michigan Central Railroad locomotive shops. Built in 1913, the shops were part of more extensive servicing facilities on the Canada Southern Railway. The museum acquired the facility in 1988 when the last owners, Canadian National Railway and Canadian Pacific Railway, left the area. The museum finally occupied the building in 1988. In 2009 15 acres of railway lands were acquired.

The museum uses trackage from the museum that runs west and then south of the Museum. The line is used for the annual Day Out with Thomas ride.

The nearby BX Tower was preserved and occupied by the museum but owned by the City of St. Thomas.

Collection
The museum collection includes five locomotives:
 Canadian National Railway #5700 "Hudson" - Montreal Locomotive Works K-5-a steam 4-6-4 locomotive
 Wabash #51 - GE 43-ton switcher
 Canadian Pacific Railway #8921 - Montreal Locomotive Works RSD-17 (the only one ever made)
 London and Port Stanley Railway #L1 - GE boxcab electric freight locomotive c.1915
 Canadian National Railway #9171 - EMD F7Au (built as EMD F3 as GTW #9013, converted 1973, retired 1989)

Several passenger and freight cars are also preserved, either inside the building or outside:

 Canadian National Railway Jordan Spreader #51041 - Built by St. Thomas Canada Southern shops  
 London and Port Stanley Railway Port Stanley Incline Cars
 Norfolk & Western Railroad Caboose #555020 - built by International Car Company of Kenton, Ohio c.1976
 Grand Trunk Western Railroad Caboose #77137 - Port Huron MI built
 Canadian National Railway Baggage Car #7074 - built by National Steel Car c.1953
 New York Central Railroad 10-5 Sleeper #10075 "Cascade Lane" - Pullman Car Company c. 1939
 London and Port Stanley Railway Electric Interurban #14 - Jewett Car Company c.1917

There is also an H0 scale model railroad that recreates scenes from the area.

Images

External links
Elgin County Railway Museum website

References

Buildings and structures in St. Thomas, Ontario
Railway museums in Ontario
Museums in Elgin County